The 2010 Salta earthquake occurred on February 27 at  in Salta Province, Argentina and had a magnitude of 6.3. It occurred less than 12 hours after the far larger magnitude 8.8 Chile earthquake, which killed 525 people. It was initially thought to be an aftershock of the Chile earthquake, but scientists later established that the earthquakes were unrelated.  The epicenter was about 15 miles north of the city of Salta. The quake killed two people, and injured dozens (possibly up to 100 people).

Damage and casualties

The damage was not great, but small buildings and slums were easily destroyed. The earthquake received little regional coverage, largely because the catastrophe in Chile, occurring a few hours earlier, garnered the most attention. Much of the destruction happened in the towns of Campo Quijano and La Merced, where several adobe houses collapsed and numerous others were left uninhabitable.

There were two deaths, including an 8-year-old boy.

See also
 List of earthquakes in 2010
 List of earthquakes in Argentina

References

External links

2010
2010 earthquakes
2010 in Argentina
2010
2010
2010 disasters in Argentina